O12 or O-12 may refer to:
 Curtiss O-12 Falcon, an observation aircraft of the United States Army Air Corps
 Grand Lake St. Marys Seaplane Base, in Auglaize County, Ohio, United States
 , a submarine of the Royal Netherlands Navy
 Oxygen-12, an isotope of oxygen
 , a submarine of the United States Navy